Archibald Loudon Snowden (August 11, 1835 – September 7, 1912) was an American politician and diplomat during the late 19th century.

Early life
Snowden was born in Cumberland County, Pennsylvania on August 11, 1835. He was a son of Margery Bines (née Louden) and Isaac Wayne Snowden. His siblings included Nathaniel Randolph Snowden, John Ross Snowden, Sarah Gustine Snowden Stewart, and Maude Loudon Snowden. Their uncle, James Ross Snowden, was a director of the United States Mint. His father was a surgeon in the U.S. Army and served in the First Seminole War under General Jackson and was wounded at Fort Scott.

Snowden graduated from Jefferson College in 1856.

Career
Following his graduation in 1856, he was made register of the United States Mint 7 May 1857.  Politically, Snowden was a Democrat until 1860 when he switched to the Republican party believing that the Democrats' policies were detrimental to the manufacturing interests of the country.

After the American Civil War broke out in 1861, Snowden assisted in raising a regiment of Pennsylvania volunteer infantry and was commissioned Lieutenant colonel.  He was subsequently elected captain of the First City Troop of Philadelphia.

He was elected as a member of the American Philosophical Society in 1873.

Post-war career
Snowden became chief coiner at the Philadelphia Mint on 1 October 1866, and from 1877 to 1879, he served as postmaster of Philadelphia,  Snowden served as the superintendent of the Philadelphia Mint from 1879 to 1885. appointed by President Ulysses S. Grant.  In 1878, he twice declined to serve as director of United States Mint, offered by President Hayes.  In 1879, he became the Chief Executor in the Philadelphia Mint and served in that role until Grover Cleveland's election in 1885.  In 1887, he served as the Marshal of the Centennial celebration of the United States Constitution, which was held in Philadelphia.

He made improvements and inventions relating to coining machinery, and wrote articles on subjects relating to coinage, the great seal of the United States, and other subjects. He was identified with railroads, insurance companies, and other business interests.

Diplomatic career
In 1889, Snowden succeeded Walker Fearn and served simultaneously as the United States Minister to Greece, Romania, and Serbia from 1889 to 1892.  From 1892 to 1893, he served as the United States Minister to Spain, succeeding Edward Burd Grubb, Jr.

Later career
Snowden was the president of the Fairmount Park Commission.  In 1903, he was accused, along with Charles A. Porter, former State Senator, C. Kennedy Crossan, a contractor and Ludwig S. Filbert, of making illegal profits through the Danville Bessemer Company.

Family
On February 16, 1864, Snowden was married to Elizabeth Robinson Smith (1841–1910). Together, they were the parents of:

 Caroline Smith Snowden (1865–1960), who married Stuyvesant Wainwright (1863–1930) in 1889.  They divorced and she married Dr. Carl F. Wolff (1864–1934).
 Mary Buchanan Snowden (b. 1866), who married Frank Samuel in 1887.
 Charles Randolph Snowden (1871–1913), who married Berthe de Pourtales Churchman (1878–1958) in 1899.
 Archibald Loudon Snowden (1878–1878), who died young.

Snowden died on September 7, 1912 in Philadelphia, Pennsylvania after battling a nine-month illness.  He is interred at Laurel Hill Cemetery in the Bridge section, Plots 9 & 10.

Descendants
He was the grandfather of Stuyvesant Wainwright (1891–1975), Snowden Wainwright (b. 1893), Loudon Snowden Wainwright (1898–1942), and Carroll Livingston Wainwright (1899–1967), and great-grandfather of Stuyvesant Wainwright II (1921–2010) and Loudon Wainwright, Jr. (1924–1988).

References

1835 births
1912 deaths
Ambassadors of the United States to Greece
Ambassadors of the United States to Romania
Ambassadors of the United States to Serbia
Ambassadors of the United States to Spain
Burials at Laurel Hill Cemetery (Philadelphia)
Washington & Jefferson College alumni
19th-century American diplomats
Pennsylvania Republicans
People from Cumberland County, Pennsylvania